Montecincla is a genus of passerine birds in the family Leiothrichidae. All four species in this genus are endemic to “sky islands” in the Western Ghats mountain range of southwestern India, generally above 1,200m elevation.

Species
The genus contains the following species:

 Nilgiri laughingthrush, Montecincla cachinnans 
 Palani laughingthrush, Montecincla fairbanki
 Banasura laughingthrush, Montecincla jerdoni
 Ashambu laughingthrush, Montecincla meridionalis

References

 
Bird genera
Leiothrichidae